The Criminal of Lost Honour (Der Verbrecher aus verlorener Ehre) is a crime report by Friedrich Schiller, first published in 1786 under the title Verbrecher aus Infamie (Criminal of Infamy).

External links
 The Criminal From Lost Honour, in Tales from the German, comprising specimens from the most celebrated authors (1844) 
 
 
 Der Verbrecher aus verlorener Ehre

1786 books
German books
Works by Friedrich Schiller